Kirk 'n Marcus is an album by pianist Kirk Lightsey's Quintet featuring Marcus Belgrave that was recorded in 1986 and released by the Dutch Criss Cross Jazz label. The CD release included two additional tracks.

Reception 

The Allmusic review states "The modern hard bop date has plenty of fine solos and is easily recommended to straight-ahead jazz collectors".

Track listing 
 "All My Love" (Marcus Belgrave) – 6:34
 "Loves I Once Knew" (David Durrah) – 6:41
 "Windmill" (Kenny Dorham) – 8:46
 "Marcus' Mates" (Robert Pipho) – 5:13
 "Golden Legacy" (Santi Debriano) – 6:39
 "Lower Bridge Level" (Jean Toussaint) – 5:36
 "Lolita" (D. Jenkins) – 6:42 Additional track on CD release	
 "Fixed Wing" (Santi Debriano) – 8:30 Additional track on CD release

Personnel 
Kirk Lightsey – piano
Marcus Belgrave – trumpet, flugelhorn
Jean Toussaint – tenor saxophone
Santi Debriano – bass
Eddie Gladden – drums

References 

Kirk Lightsey albums
1987 albums
Criss Cross Jazz albums
Albums recorded at Van Gelder Studio